Glaciimonas is a genus of bacteria in the Oxalobacteraceae family. Its name comes from glaciers where it was first found and monad, a single cell. Glaciimonas = a cell from the glacier.

References

Burkholderiales
Bacteria genera